is a Japanese manga series by . Guilty is serialized digitally on  since September 1, 2017. A live-action television drama adaptation titled  was broadcast from April 2, 2020, to August 6, 2020, as part of YTV's  programming block.

Plot

Sayaka Ogino is a 35-year-old editor of a fashion magazine living with her husband of 10 years, Kazuma. Despite a seemingly perfect life, Sayaka wants children but learns that Kazuma does not, and she confides her troubles to her friend Rui Oikawa. To her surprise, Sayaka eventually learns that Kazuma is cheating on her with Rui, and that Rui is fixated on ruining her life. The more Sayaka learns of Rui's lies, the more unpleasant secrets she learns about the people close to her.

Characters

Sayaka is an editor of a fashion magazine.

Kazuma is Sayaka's husband of 10 years who works at a high-paying position at an advertising company.

Rui is Sayaka's friend, who is younger than her.

Akiyama is Sayaka's ex-boyfriend from high school and the owner of an Italian restaurant. 

Terashima is a university student who works as an intern at Sayaka's company.

Media

Manga

It began serialization digitally on the  website on September 1, 2017. The chapters were later released in eight tankōbon volumes by Kodansha under the Be Love KC imprint. On April 30, 2021, the series entered its final arc. The series ended serialization on October 30, 2022.

At the New York Comic Con 2019, Kodansha USA announced that they had licensed the series in English for North American distribution, with the volumes distributed digitally.

Television drama

A live-action television series adaptation titled  was announced in the April 2020 issue of the manga magazine Be Love. The series aired on April 2, 2020, on YTV and NTV as part of the  programming block. It stars Yua Shinkawa as Sayaka Ogino. The series is directed by Yo Kawahara, with Yōko Izumisawa in charge of the script. The opening theme song is "Be All Right" by Toshi, released as his first original song in 22 years.

After the broadcast of the first three episodes, the series was delayed due to the COVID-19 pandemic. From April 23 to May 7, 2020, the first three episodes were rebroadcast as television specials with commentary. The series resumed broadcast on June 25, 2020. A special episode titled "The Door of Sin" was released exclusively on Hulu on July 9, 2020. Dori Sakurada made a special guest appearance beginning with episode 8 as Moriya, an editorial staff member of a weekly tabloid magazine and an original character made for the television series.

Reception

In 2019, Guilty had sold a consecutive total of 1.5 million physical and digital copies.

References

External links 

 
  

2017 manga
2020 Japanese television series debuts
Japanese television dramas based on manga
Japanese webcomics
Josei manga
Kodansha manga
Romance anime and manga
Suspense anime and manga
Television productions postponed due to the COVID-19 pandemic
Webcomics in print